Thalavoi (North) is a village in the Sendurai taluk of Ariyalur district, Tamil Nadu, India.

Demographics 

As per the 2001 census, Thalavoi (North) had a total population of 2426 with 1175 males and 1251 females.

References 

Villages in Ariyalur district